John Baird Glen, also known as Iain Glen, is a Scottish veterinarian.

Biography 
Born in Scotland, Glen grew up on a small farm. He studied veterinary medicine at the University of Glasgow. After the completion of his study, he became a practicing animal surgeon.

In 2018, he received the prestigious Lasker Award for discovering propofol.

References 

British veterinarians
Alumni of the University of Glasgow
Recipients of the Lasker-DeBakey Clinical Medical Research Award
Living people
Year of birth missing (living people)